Wnt-10a is a protein that in humans is encoded by the WNT10A gene.

Function 

The WNT gene family consists of structurally related genes which encode secreted signaling proteins. These proteins have been implicated in oncogenesis and in several developmental processes, including regulation of cell fate and patterning during embryogenesis. This gene is a member of the WNT gene family.

Clinical significance 

WNT10A is strongly expressed in the cell lines of promyelocytic leukemia and Burkitt's lymphoma. In addition, it and another family member, the WNT6 gene, are strongly coexpressed in colorectal cancer cell lines. The gene overexpression may play key roles in carcinogenesis through activation of the WNT-beta-catenin-TCF signaling pathway. This gene and the WNT6 gene are clustered in the chromosome 2q35 region.

Mutations in the WNT10A gene are associated with Schöpf–Schulz–Passarge syndrome and hypodontia.

References

Further reading